Cornelius W. Armstrong (December 18, 1827 – after 1872) was an American merchant and politician from New York.

Life
He was born on December 18, 1827, in Hoosick, Rensselaer County, New York, the son of Alvin Armstrong. He attended the common schools. In 1843, he began to work as a clerk in Penn Yan. In 1847, he moved to Wayne County, and later to Albany. There he engaged in the wholesale of produce, and entered politics as a Democrat.

He was a member of the New York State Assembly (Albany Co., 3rd D.) in 1858.

At the New York state election, 1865, he ran for Canal Commissioner, but was defeated by Republican Robert C. Dorn. He was a presidential elector in 1868.

Armstrong was Clerk of the New York State Assembly from January 1, 1868, to January 5, 1869, officiating in the 91st New York State Legislature;  and again from January 4, 1870, to January 2, 1872, officiating in the 93rd and 94th New York State Legislatures. In 1871, he supervised the publication of A Compilation of Cases of Breaches of Privilege of the House in the Assembly of the State of New York (251 pg.).

References

1827 births
Year of death unknown
People from Hoosick, New York
Democratic Party members of the New York State Assembly
Clerks of the New York State Assembly
Politicians from Albany, New York
1868 United States presidential electors